The 2022 Jordanian Pro League (known as The Jordanian Pro League,   was the 70th season of Jordanian Pro League since its inception in 1944. The season started on 8 April and finished on 4 November 2022, Al-Faisaly   won the title for the 35th time, Al-Jazeera and Al-Sareeh relegated to the  League Division 1. 

Al-Ramtha are the defending champions of the 2021 season. Moghayer Al-Sarhan and Al-Sareeh joined as the promoted clubs from the 2021 League Division 1. They replaced Al-Baqa'a and Al-Jalil who were relegated to the 2022 League Division 1.

Teams
Twelve teams will compete in the league – the top ten teams from the 2021 season and the two teams promoted from the 2021 Division 1.

Teams promoted to the 2022 Premier League

The first team to be promoted was Moghayer Al-Sarhan, following their 2–0 victory against Ittihad Al-Ramtha on 6 November 2021. Moghayer Al-Sarhan promoted to the Premier League for the first time.

The second team to be promoted was Al-Sareeh, following their 1-1 draw against Moghayer Al-Sarhan on 23 November 2021, the last day of the regular season.

Stadiums and locations
Note: Table lists in alphabetical order.

Personnel and kits

Foreign players

League table

Results

References

Jordanian Pro League seasons
2021–22 in Jordanian football
2022–23 in Jordanian football
Jordan Premier League